Krakau is a municipality in the district of Murau in Styria, Austria. It was created on 1 January 2015 when the municipalities of Krakaudorf, Krakauhintermühlen and Krakauschatten were merged.

Geography
Krakau lies on a high plateau in the south of the Schladming Tauern.

References

Cities and towns in Murau District